Jeffrey Ong (born 30 April 1972) is a Malaysian swimmer. He competed at the 1988 Summer Olympics and the 1992 Summer Olympics.

References

1972 births
Living people
Malaysian male swimmers
Olympic swimmers of Malaysia
Swimmers at the 1988 Summer Olympics
Swimmers at the 1992 Summer Olympics
Commonwealth Games competitors for Malaysia
Swimmers at the 1990 Commonwealth Games
Universiade medalists in swimming
Place of birth missing (living people)
Asian Games medalists in swimming
Asian Games silver medalists for Singapore
Swimmers at the 1990 Asian Games
Medalists at the 1990 Asian Games
Southeast Asian Games medalists in swimming
Southeast Asian Games gold medalists for Malaysia
Southeast Asian Games silver medalists for Malaysia
Competitors at the 1987 Southeast Asian Games
Universiade silver medalists for Malaysia
Medalists at the 1991 Summer Universiade
Medalists at the 1993 Summer Universiade
20th-century Malaysian people